União das Freguesias de Aldeia do Mato e Souto is a freguesia ("civil parish") in the municipality of Abrantes, Portugal. It was formed in 2013 by the merger of the former parishes Aldeia do Mato and Souto. The population in 2011 was 859, in an area of 44.77 km².

References

Freguesias of Abrantes